Indirect presidential elections were held in Finland in 1943. The 1937 electoral college was recalled and re-elected Risto Ryti, who received 269 of the 300 votes.  President Ryti was ready to remain in office and to try to lead Finland successfully through World War II.  Nevertheless, some Finnish politicians believed that Marshal Mannerheim, the Commander-in-Chief of the Finnish army, would lead Finland more effectively.  In a test vote, 147 presidential electors out of 300 supported Mannerheim.  This plurality was not, however, enough for Mannerheim who required an assured majority of electors to back him for his presidential candidacy.  Having failed to receive this majority's support, Mannerheim withdrew his candidacy and Ryti was overwhelmingly re-elected president.

Results

References

1943
1943 elections in Finland